Don't Look Away Now! is an album by saxophonist James Moody recorded in 1969 which was released on the Prestige label.

Reception

The Allmusic site awarded the album 4½ stars.

Track listing 
All compositions by James Moody except as indicated
 "Don't Look Away Now" - 3:19  
 "Darben the Redd Fox" - 7:10  
 "Easy Living" (Ralph Rainger, Leo Robin) - 5:33  
 "Hey Herb! Where's Alpert?" - 3:36  
 "Hear Me" - 9:26  
 "When I Fall in Love" (Edward Heyman, Victor Young) - 6:07  
 "Last Train from Overbrook" - 4:32

Personnel 
James Moody - tenor saxophone, alto saxophone
Barry Harris - piano
Bob Cranshaw - electric bass
Alan Dawson - drums 
Eddie Jefferson - vocals (track 4)

References 

James Moody (saxophonist) albums
1969 albums
Prestige Records albums
Albums produced by Don Schlitten